Ramusculus is a monotypic genus of air-breathing land snails, terrestrial gastropod mollusks in the family Enidae. The sole species lives in the Crimean Peninsula. 
The only species belonging to Ramusculus is Bulimus subulata (Rossmässler 1837). Zebrina (Ramusculus) mienisi Gittenberger 1986 living in Erzurum Province (northeast Turkey) was also assigned to Ramusculus, but was subsequently placed in a separate genus, Ayna Páll-Gergely, 2009.

References

External links
 AnimalBase info including a shell image

Enidae
Gastropod genera
Taxa named by Wassili Adolfovitch Lindholm